José Joaquim da Rocha ( 1737 - Salvador, October 12, 1807) was a Brazilian painter, engraver, gilder and restorer. His entire production was in the field of religious art, with the Catholic Church as his exclusive patron. He left numerous works of a scholarly character, moving away from the popular tradition that was common during the colonial period. Although his work has many moments of high level, it is uneven, partly because, since he became recognized, he always had many disciples and apprentices to assist him, to whom he delivered large portions of the work, and partly because of the use, as inspiration, of a varied iconography in engraving of irregular quality. Both practices were, however, common at the time.

He painted many easel pieces, but his most famous compositions are the great ceilings of churches made in the illusionistic perspective technique, organizing complex virtual architectural structures ornamented with garlands and scrolls, which support a central medallion, where the main scene of the set appears, usually showing Jesus or the Virgin Mary in glorifying situations. Like other works of the Baroque period, the painting should edify the observer and instruct him in the precepts of the Catholic Church, making use of a sumptuous plasticity that, through the seduction of the senses, leads the devotee to the contemplation of the beauties of the spirit.

Despite having already received critical attention from several well-known specialists, the study of his production still needs to be explored, especially in relation to authorship, since he did not sign any work and most of what he left behind is assigned to him based only on oral tradition, without corroborating documentation, which makes it difficult to understand his trajectory and style. Based on what is known with more certainty, José Joaquim da Rocha has already been recognized as an artist of great importance, considered the founder of the Bahian school of painting, the greatest of its members and one of the great masters of the Brazilian Baroque. He left several disciples and influenced two generations of artists, who preserved principles of his aesthetics until the mid-19th century.

Biography 
There is not much information about his life, and most of the works attributed to him have no supporting documentation. An anonymous manuscript found by Carlos Ott in the National Library, dated between 1866 and 1876, says that José Joaquim came from Minas Gerais, but this origin is doubtful. Other authors point to Salvador, Rio de Janeiro or even Portugal. The year he was born is also uncertain, but it has been said that he was 70 years old when he died in 1807.

He was in Salvador between 1764 and 1765, possibly studying with Antônio Simões Ribeiro. There, he assisted Leandro Ferreira de Sousa in a painting of a panel of Christ tied to a column and in the gilding of the frame, a work done for the Santa Casa Collection Holy House of Mercy of Bahia that cost was 9$600 réis, according to a payment receipt that has been preserved. At this time he lived upstairs in a small two-story house belonging to the Holy House, paying rent of 7$500 réis every three months, which he could not always afford, indicating a poor condition.

There is no record of his life between January 22, 1766, and August 28, 1769. He may have gone to Joao Pessoa to work on the Convent and Church of St. Anthony, whose famous ceiling with the scene of the Glorification of the Franciscan Saints has its authorship disputed, sometimes attributed to him but without documentation. It is possible, as an oral tradition sustains, that during this period he went to Lisbon to improve himself, coming into contact with Antonio Lobo and Jerônimo de Andrade - although it is not known who might have been his patron. However, according to the researcher Maria de Fátima Campos, Salvador was already able to provide an adequate education to a talented young man. When he comes back, he is already a mature painter, disputing a large order of illusionistic perspective painting, a technique that required a great mastery of the craft, to be performed in the Church of Our Lady of Health and Glory, with established masters such as Domingos da Costa Filgueira and José Renovato Maciel. Despite offering a more advantageous price, the work was given to Filgueira. Apparently, he continued to live poorly, renting a small house on Capitães Street.

He may have gone to Recife in 1769 to decorate the ceiling of the church of the Church and Convent of Saint Antony, but the authorship of the work is uncertain. In 1770 he may have decorated the Church of the Third Order of the Blessed Virgin Mary of Our Lady of the Conception of the Mulatto Brothers. In 1772 or 1773 he was in Salvador and was hired to paint an illusionistic perspective on the ceiling of the Basilica of the Immaculate Conception, one of the most important churches in Bahia at the time. The work resulted in his masterpiece, which is also one of the most remarkable paintings of its kind in Brazil. It is a great Glorification of the Immaculate Conception among allegories of the four continents, divine figures and monumental illusionistic architecture. The contract also required him to paint the chancel and to embody the statue of Mary on the main altar. He charged the derisory price of 1,009$920 réis for everything, but when he delivered the order he received an additional 180$000 réis as compensation for his losses. The success of the composition on the ceiling of the nave earned him at least the definitive recognition as the best painter in Bahia. From then on he was able to begin to maintain a permanent team of helpers and to train disciples. In 1777 he received the task of painting a Visitation of Mary to Saint Elizabeth for the altarpiece of the chapel of the Holy House, which is one of his best works on easel.

The following period was very productive, in which in a few years he accomplished - at least according to oral tradition - several major works. Between 1778 and 1780 the Third Order of Our Lady of Mount Carmel hired him to gild the altarpiece of the chancel, and he may also have done the panel with the image, work lost in a fire shortly after. Around 1780 he painted another Visitation in the Secretariat of the Holy House, at the same time that he was involved with the ceilings of the Church of the Good Jesus of the Afflicted (c. 1780), the Church of the Third Order of Our Lady of the Rosary of the Black People (1780) and the Church of the Third Order of Saint Dominic (1781). In 1785 he began work on the Church and Convent of Our Lady of the Palm, which would only be finished several years later. In the first phase he limited himself to making the project of the central medallion and the perspective of the ceiling, but the execution was left to an unknown painter, perhaps his disciple Veríssimo de Freitas.

In the meantime, it is assumed that he painted the ceiling of the Old Chapel of Saint Peter. The contract hasn't been preserved to confirm the attribution, but the parish archives confirm his nomination as Brother of the Resurrection on November 5, 1786, which at least attests to his connection with the brotherhood that maintained the church and may indicate that he was the author. The painting was, years later, retouched by José Rodrigues Nunes, and in recent times, destroyed along with the church. According to Cunha Barbosa, who saw the painting in 1900, it was unfortunate because it was the most perfect of all his perspective works. In the same period he may have been the author of the ceiling and two canvases in the Parish of Our Lady of Nazareth in Salvador. This amount of large orders would not have been possible to attend to if he did not have by now a large team of assistants and apprentices to help him.

Around 1790, he left another series of secondary panels in the Church and Convent of Our Lady of the Palm, whose personal authorship seems more secured. Therefore, the church became the largest repository of José Joaquim's works. In compensation for his dedication to the needs of the church, the brotherhood of the Good Jesus of the Cross named him Honorary Brother. In 1792, he created six large paintings for the chancel of the Holy House, and was also in charge of gilding the frames, for which he received 140$000 réis. Soon after, he left several panels in the Mercês Chapel.

Although by this stage his economic situation was much better than it had been when he was young, he never became rich, despite the numerous orders and the fact that he could set his own prices. According to some records, he had just enough to lead a decent life, but without any luxury. He was generous, giving almost everything he received in alms to the poor, and paying for dinners for the prisoners in jail. In 1794, already an old man, he sold his own house for no declared reason, but it is supposed to have been to help his favorite disciple, José Teófilo de Jesus, who, in fact, went to Europe to improve himself, at the master's expense.

His last important commission came in 1796 in the form of six panels with gilding in the sacristy of the Parish Church of Our Lady of Pilar, for which he received 368$000 réis. Afterwards, he continued painting smaller works. In 1796, for 12$000 réis, he created a Christ with green cane for the Holy House of Mercy, and in 1801, he painted two pictures for the Church of the Third Order of Saint Francis. After that, the traces of his life were lost. Between 1802 and 1803 he was again living in a cheap rented house belonging to the Third Order of Our Lady of Mount Carmel. His last years were afflicted by illness, and he spent them in a country house he owned in the Parish of Saint Anthony. There, he died on October 12, 1807, without having married and leaving no known descendants. He was buried in the Church and Convent of Our Lady of the Palm.

Work and context 

With the Catholic Church being the major patron in that period and there being almost no market for profane painting in the colony, José Joaquim's entire production is in sacred art.  During the Baroque period in which he lived, the Church gave many of the guidelines regarding the creation of the work, determining the theme, the ways to represent it, and even deciding on the secondary decorations. It was up to the artists to follow this orientation, although within this framework there was room for a lot of creativity, as long as it did not clash with the precepts. The sacred art of that time, much more than serving as simple decoration for churches, was in essence functional and didactic: it had the specific and greater purpose of edifying the people in good manners and stimulating their devotion through dramatic works, of great visual appeal and intense evocative power. As it was a common practice in its time, his stylistic sources derive both from learning from the masters - the influence of the Portuguese school of painting being preponderant - and from the study of a rich iconography of engravings and prints that circulated in the colony. This material, which came in quantities from Europe, was a very heterogeneous set of images of various styles and eras, many of which were copies of famous compositions. This partly explains the eclecticism and the imitative-creative sense of the Brazilian Baroque and of José Joaquim's own work, since it is known that he followed the norms and also used this type of image as a model in many of his creations, often adapting the consecrated formulas in an original way. At the same time, this contributes to the fact that the quality level of his production is not very consistent, and also that he puts many apprentices at different stages of training to assist him. These factors problematize the exact characterization of their personal style and make it difficult to identify how far each one acted. However, all these features were the norm of their time, and are what typify the Brazilian Baroque.

José Joaquim's work still needs further study; nevertheless, specialized critics have already managed to uncover part of his history and his artistic individuality has already been reasonably delimited, with a dense style and great plasticity, well above the average of his context in refinement and technical skill, having an erudite and disciplined character, in line with the rules of his time, but without ceasing to be creative. Therefore, he inspired two generations of followers.

His works of illusionistic perspective on the ceilings of the Basilica of the Immaculate Conception, the Church of the Third Order of Saint Dominic and the Church of the Third Order of Our Lady of the Rosary of the Black People (attribution), his most ambitious and impactful creations, in a technique that became much appreciated in colonial Brazil, are directly connected to a tradition inaugurated in Italy and consecrated by Andrea Pozzo in the 17th century, who created an illusion of three-dimensional space on the ceilings, opening to the sky in glorious visions. This technique required a great knowledge of perspective, which only very talented and well-trained artists were able to master. Although it may have been in Portugal where he learned the technique, Pozzo's influence was already felt in Brazil since the early 18th century. He may have known the Italian's greatest creation, the ceiling of the Church of St. Ignatius of Loyola in Rome, a work that produced a vast school, through engravings. Carlos Ott dared to suggest that his supposed trip to Portugal might have extended to Italy, where he might have seen the celebrated painting. However, according to Paiva & Pires, his interpretation of Pozzo's style follows a specifically Portuguese tradition. Pozzo accentuated the figures of the main scene so that the illusion of three-dimensionality was extended from the fictitious architecture to the sky without breaking continuity. However, the Portuguese artists, followed by José Joaquim, Mestre Ataíde and other colonial painters, chose to create a well-defined central medallion, with no pronounced outline in the figures, giving rise to a flatter space. It was what was called a "relocated painting", since its internal spatial composition was equivalent to that of the panels intended to be seen on the walls.

In terms of theme, it depended a lot on the choices made by the brotherhoods that sponsored him. The most common scenes involved the Virgin Mary, such as her marriage, the Annunciation, the Visitation, and the birth of Jesus. The scenes from the life of Christ, even though less common, left some works such as the Passion and Death, the Resurrection and the Pentecost.

Legacy 

Until the appearance of José Joaquim, the painting in Bahia was modest. Despite being the capital of the colony and a bustling commercial hub, Salvador was still a small city, and only reached 50,000 inhabitants in 1808. It was also the main cultural center of Brazil, but in many ways it was a provincial culture, dominated by religion, which operated on the basis of slave labor. On the artistic side, it relied heavily on improvisation and poorly trained and paid craftsmen, including slaves and slave-owning brown men, with rare masters such as Calmão, Simões, Filgueira and Maciel, who were the forerunners and contemporaries of José Joaquim. The importance of these artists as good pioneers cannot be underestimated, but José Joaquim's greatest legacy is in having given a great renovating and qualifying impulse to the school of Bahia, being considered its founder and the most outstanding member of a school that kept alive the baroque tradition of its master until the middle of the 19th century.

In a 1961 survey, Carlos Ott listed 52 works of his authorship, including both attributed and documented works. In a 2005 publication, Percival Tirapeli claimed that the number of identified works had risen to 150. However, these numbers may be misleading, and there is considerable controversy over attributions. Almost all of them remain in situ, but some of his easel works are preserved in the Bahia Museum of Art, the Museum of Sacred Art of Bahia, and the Museum of the Holy House of Mercy of Bahia.

Among his disciples are Sousa Coutinho, Franco Velasco, Lopes Marques, Antônio Dias, Nunes da Mota, Mateus Lopes, Veríssimo de Freitas, Rufino Capinam, and José Teófilo de Jesus, the most important among them and the master's favorite. His work has been studied by Manuel Raimundo Querino (who introduced the concept of "School of Bahia"), Carlos Ott, Clarival do Prado Valadares, Marieta Alves, Maria de Fátima Campos and other experts, but needs more research to clarify the controversies and uncertainties that surround it, especially regarding the attributions of authorship. Its importance, however, has already been widely recognized, and can be summarized in the words of Carlos Ott:Although he was inspired by Portuguese and particularly Italian painting, he created a new painting: the painting of Bahia. And this at a time when in Brazil, still a Portuguese colony, few artists reveal a typically Brazilian mentality. José Joaquim da Rocha's paintings are not about popular art, as is the case with countless paintings existing in the churches of Bahia. He went through a school and, what was more, founded a school for painters.He left a precious legacy that also needs better conservation. The ceiling of the Basilica of the Immaculate Conception, his greatest work and one of the most important of the Brazilian Baroque, was for several years in the process of degradation, and according to technical reports, it almost collapsed, but the National Institute of Historic and Artistic Heritage started an emergency restoration in 2012. The works of the Old Chapel of Saint Peter, considered among his best, were destroyed in a renovation in the 20th century, and the ceiling of the Church of the Third Order of Our Lady of the Rosary of the Black People, also among his best (if it is really his, being an attribution), was long ago covered by repainting and forgotten. It was however rediscovered in 1979 in a restoration. Years passed and it was again considered lost by the accumulation of mold, dirt, moisture and oxidation of the varnish, but again it was "rediscovered" and restored in 2010.

See also 

 Andrea Pozzo
 Manoel da Costa Ataíde

References 
1807 deaths
Brazilian Baroque
Baroque painters
Baroque paintings
Brazilian painters